The Stapleton Limestone is a geologic formation in Jamaica. It preserves fossils dating back to the Cretaceous period.

See also

 List of fossiliferous stratigraphic units in Jamaica

References
 

Limestone formations
Cretaceous Jamaica
Geologic formations of Jamaica
Geologic formations of the Caribbean